Manger is a former municipality in the old Hordaland county, Norway. The municipality existed from 1838 until its dissolution in 1964. It was located in what is now Alver Municipality in Vestland county. Upon its dissolution in 1964, Manger encompassed .  The municipality originally included almost all of the island of Radøy, the northern part of the island of Holsnøy, and all the islands of northern Øygarden. Over time, the municipality was reduced in size several times, so that by 1964, it was just the central part of Radøy island.  The administrative centre was the village of Manger where Manger Church is located.

History
The parish of Manger was established as a municipality on 1 January 1838 (see formannskapsdistrikt law). On 1 January 1871, the northwestern island district (population: 2,484) was separated to form the new municipality of Herdla. Then on 1 January 1910, the rest of the islands in the west of Manger (population: 986) was separated to form the new municipality of Hjelme. This left Manger with a population of 4,453. On 1 July 1924, all that was left of Manger was divided into three separate municipalities: the northern part became the new municipality of Bø, the southern part became the new municipality of Sæbø, and the remainder in the center was a much smaller Manger municipality. After this, Manger had a population of 1,426.

During the 1960s, there were many municipal mergers across Norway due to the work of the Schei Committee. On 1 January 1964, the municipality was dissolved and a merged with the following places to form the new Radøy Municipality.
all Manger Municipality (population: 1,344)
all Hordabø Municipality (population: 1,679)
the island of Bognøy from Herdla Municipality (population: 29)
most of Sæbø Municipality, except the Titland area on the Lindås peninsula (population: 916)
the Sletta area on the island of Radøy from Lindås Municipality (population: 305)
the Straume area on the island of Radøy and the small island of Fesøy from Austrheim Municipality (population: 56)

Government
The municipal council  of Manger was made up of 13 representatives that were elected to four-year terms.  The party breakdown of the final municipal council was as follows:

See also
List of former municipalities of Norway

References

Alver (municipality)
Former municipalities of Norway
1838 establishments in Norway
1964 disestablishments in Norway